Joseph Ching-Ming Wu is a professor and medical researcher.

Career
He is the Simon H. Stertzer Professor of Medicine & Radiology at Stanford University and the director of the Stanford Cardiovascular Institute.

In 2022 he was elected to the Academia Sinica.

References

Stanford University faculty
Members of Academia Sinica